Giuseppe Pierotti or Pier Giuseppe Pierotti (Castelnuovo di Garfagnana, Province of Lucca, 1826 - 1884) was an Italian sculptor and painter. There is an Italian sculptor of the same name from Cuneo.

Biography
He was a pupil of Giuseppe Bezzuoli and Tommaso Gazzarini at the Academy of Florence. He initially completed paintings of sacred subjects, including a Madonna and Child and a Blessed Simone Carmelitano in 1849. His sculpture of a Wounded Gladiator was awarded the Canonica prize in 1855. He also worked at the sculptural decoration of the Cathedral of Milan.

He then moved to Florence. In 1870 at Parma, he exhibited Un ritratto muliebre, a pastel work. At Milan, in 1872, exhibited Vase of Flowers with symbols of Florence and Portrait of the signora Marianna Grassi. In 1884 at Turin, he displayed St Louis praying in his Chapel, Portrait of a Man, Portrait of a Woman and a bronzed terracotta statuette, depicting: Amore preso nella rete.

Pierotti's marble statue of American Indian Attacked by a Boa Constrictor is found in the Irving Zucker Sculpture Garden of the Art Gallery of Hamilton, Canada.

References

1826 births
1884 deaths
Italian genre painters
19th-century Italian painters
Italian male painters
Artists from Lucca
19th-century Italian sculptors
Italian male sculptors
Accademia di Belle Arti di Firenze alumni
19th-century Italian male artists